The 2008–09 Saint Louis Billikens men's basketball team represented Saint Louis University in the 2008–09 college basketball season. This was head coach Rick Majerus's second season at Saint Louis. The Billikens competed in the Atlantic 10 Conference.  It was also the Billikens first season in which they played their home games at Chaifetz Arena. They finished the season 18–14 and 8–8 in A-10 play.

Roster

References

Saint Louis
Saint Louis Billikens men's basketball seasons
Saint Louis Bilikens men's basketball
Saint Louis Bilikens men's basketball